Aldhila Ray Redondo (born 19 March 1996) is an Indonesian professional footballer who plays as a goalkeeper for Liga 1 club PSIS Semarang.

Club career

PSIS Semarang
He was signed for PSIS Semarang to play in Liga 1 in the 2021–22 season. Ray made his professional debut on 29 March 2022 in a match against Persela Lamongan at the Kapten I Wayan Dipta Stadium, Gianyar.

Career statistics

Club

References

External links
 Ray Redondo at Soccerway

1996 births
Living people
Indonesian footballers
Association football goalkeepers
Liga 2 (Indonesia) players
Liga 1 (Indonesia) players
Persipa Pati players
Persijap Jepara players
Persiku Kudus players
PSIS Semarang players
People from Semarang Regency
Sportspeople from Central Java